Okay Gönensin (October 14, 1950 – July 13, 2017) was a Turkish journalist.

Okay Gönensin was born in Sarıkamış, Kars Province on October 14, 1950. After finishing the St. Joseph High School in Istanbul in 1967, he studied at Ankara University's Faculty of Political Science and graduated in 1972. He entered his journalism career at the daily  Cumhuriyet in 1975. He served as editor in chief, editorial coordinator, executive editor and columnist at the newspapers Cumhuriyet, Sabah, Yeni Yüzyıl, Star and Yeni Binyıl. Lately, he worked with the daily Vatan, he had co-founded.

Gönensin was married to journalist Zeynep Göğüş. The marriage ended with divorce. He died in the early hours of July 13, 2017. He was interred at Nakkaştepe Cemetery following the religious funeral held at Zincirlikuyu Cemetery Mosque. He is survived by a son Can.

References

1950 births
2017 deaths
Turkish journalists
Turkish columnists
Cumhuriyet people
Sabah (newspaper) people
Yeni Yüzyıl people
Star (Turkish newspaper) people
Vatan people
People from Sarıkamış
St. Joseph High School Istanbul alumni
Ankara University Faculty of Political Sciences alumni